Founded as the Institute of Linguists in 1910, the Chartered Institute of Linguists (CIOL) received its Royal Charter in 2005, and is a professional association for language professionals. CIOL supports linguists throughout their careers, and promotes proficiency in modern languages worldwide.

Professional grades of membership are: Associate (ACIL), Member (MCIL) and Fellow (FCIL);  three pre-professional grades are: Student Affiliate, IoLET Affiliate and Career Affiliate.

The IoL Educational Trust (IoLET) is a registered charity and accredited awarding organisation. From 2019 it has traded as CIOL Qualifications.

As a Chartered body, CIOL holds the register of Chartered Linguists in the public interest, a source of qualified, practising and experienced professional linguists. Members and Fellows may apply to be on the Chartered Linguist register if they fulfil the required criteria.

CIOL's patron is Prince Michael of Kent.

Some notable living Fellows and Honorary Fellows
 Donald Adamson (Hon FCIL)
 Tim Connell 
 Baroness Coussins (Hon FCIL)
 David Crystal (Hon FCIL)
 Andrew Dalby (Hon FCIL)
 Baroness Garden (Hon FCIL)
 John Gillespie
 Stephen Hagen (Hon FCIL)
 Riccardo Moratto 
 Sir Ivor Roberts
 Peter Sutton
 Diana Wallis MEP (Hon FCIL)
 Michael Worton (Hon FCIL)

Examinations
The CIOL's associated charity IoL Educational Trust (trading as CIOL Qualifications) is a language assessment and regulated awarding body. Among other things, the qualifications are useful for court and police interpreting. These are:
 Certificate in Bilingual Skills (CBS) – A level equivalent for practical bilingual skills
 Diploma in Public Service Interpreting (DPSI) – Level 6; typically required for court interpreting
 Diploma in Translation (DipTrans) – Level 7 – the gold standard qualification for working as a translator
 Diploma in Police Interpreting (DPI) – Level 6 – interpreting for the police throughout the UK

See also
 The Linguist – Magazine of the Chartered Institute of Linguists
 List of UK interpreting and translation associations

References

External links

Chartered Institute of Linguists
 Find-a-Linguist service - search CIOL's members to find a Translator, Interpreter etc.
CIOL's Code of Professional Conduct

Learned societies of the United Kingdom
Linguists
Organisations based in London with royal patronage
Organisations based in the London Borough of Camden
1910 establishments in the United Kingdom
Organizations established in 1910
Linguists
Translation associations of the United Kingdom